Massaranduba Extractive Reserve is an extractive reserve in the state of Rondônia, Brazil.

Location

Massaranduba Extractive Reserve is in the municipality of Machadinho d'Oeste, Rondônia.
According to an NGO in 1994 there were only five inhabitants and 99.48% of the original vegetation coverage remained. 
The main threat was illegal removal of timber.

Economy

Massaranduba Extractive Reserve  is one of 15 small extractive reserves in the municipalities of Machadinho d'Oeste, Cujubim and Vale do Anari, remnants of the former Seringal Santo Antônio, Seringal São Paulo and Seringal São Gonçalo  rubber extraction concessions. 
They are administered by the Association of Machadinho Rubber Tappers.
The main resource extracted from the forest is rubber, as well as nuts and copaiba oil.

History

On 18 November 1991 the Massaranduba Forest Reserve was closed to settlement, deforestation, professional fishing, logging, mining and other activities that could compromise sustainable use other than the activities of small farmers, rubber tappers and fisherfolk.
The purpose was to provide an area for sustainable use and conservation of natural resources by the agro-extractive population.

Notes

Sources

1995 establishments in Brazil
Extractive reserves of Brazil
Protected areas of Rondônia